The National People's Party is a national-level political party in India, though its influence is mostly concentrated in the state of Meghalaya. The party was founded by P. A. Sangma after his expulsion from the NCP in July 2012. It was accorded national party status on 7 June 2019. It is the first political party from Northeastern India to have attained this status.

History
In January 2013, P. A. Sangma launched the party on the national level. He announced that his party would be in alliance with the National Democratic Alliance led by Bharatiya Janta Party. Sangma also reiterated that though the membership of the party is open to all, it shall be a tribalcentric party.

Sangma who has been a nine-time Member of Parliament, had announced to form a new political party soon after his expulsion from the Nationalist Congress Party in July 2012, when he refused to accept party decision to quit the 2012 Indian presidential election. NPP contested the assembly election of Rajasthan in December 2013, under the leadership of Kirodi Lal Meena, a former BJP member and MP (Independent from Dausa) at the time of election and won four seats.

Currently, it is a part of North-East Democratic Alliance consisting of political parties of the northeast which has supported the National Democratic Alliance.

In 2015, in a rare move election commission has suspended NPP for its failure to provide party's expenditure during Lok Sabha Elections held in 2014. NPP became first party to get suspended by EC.

In September 2015, the leaders of six parties—Samajwadi Party, Nationalist Congress Party, Jan Adhikar Party, Samras Samaj Party, National People's Party and Samajwadi Janata Party announced the formation of a third front known as the Socialist Secular Morcha. National People's Party is fighting on 3 seats as part of Socialist Secular Morcha in 2015 Bihar Legislative Assembly election.

In May 2016, after the Bharatiya Janata Party led National Democratic Alliance formed its first government in Assam, and formed a new alliance called the North-East Democratic Alliance (NEDA) with Himanta Biswa Sarma as its convener. The Chief Ministers of the north eastern states of Sikkim, Assam, and Nagaland too belong to this alliance. Thus, the National People's Party joined the BJP-led NEDA.

The NPP contested 9 candidates in the 2017 Manipur Legislative Assembly election and won 4 seats.

The NPP won 19 seats in the 2018 Meghalaya Legislative Assembly election. Although the ruling Indian National Congress emerged as the single largest party, the NEDA collectively held a majority. Conrad Sangma thus became Chief Minister, becoming the first member of the party to lead an Indian state.

The party decided to contest the 2023 assembly elections without any pre-poll alliances.

Election symbol

Its election symbol is a book. The significance for the same is that the party believes that only literacy and education can empower the weaker sections.

Elections

The party won a seat in 2014 Loksabha elections from Tura and Sangma became MP. After the death of P. A. Sangma, from this seat his son Conrad Sangma won by-election held in May 2016. The party had proposed to contest election and expand its base in tribal constituencies of Andhra Pradesh, Maharashtra, Rajasthan, Gujarat, Jharkhand, Chhattisgarh, Madhya Pradesh, Odisha, northern West Bengal and the Northeast India.

In March 2018, the party won 19 out of 60 assembly seats in the Meghalaya Legislative Assembly election 2018 and formed government in the state in coalition with BJP and other parties and party president Conrad Sangma sworn in as Chief Minister of the state. In May 2018, the party won Williamnagar Assembly seat in a by-election making its tally to 20 out of 60 assembly seats in Meghalaya Legislative Assembly.

Election Results

Rajasthan Legislative Assembly

Manipur Legislative Assembly

Nagaland Legislative Assembly

Meghalaya Legislative Assembly

Arunachal Pradesh Legislative Assembly

Members of Parliament

Lok Sabha
Tura Lok Sabha, Meghalaya

Rajya Sabha

Chief ministers

Meghalaya 
 Conrad Sangma
 First term: 6 March 2018 to 7 March 2023
 Second term: 7 March 2023 - Incumbent

Deputy Chief ministers

Manipur 
 Yumnam Joykumar Singh
 First term: 15 March 2017 to 17 June 2020 and 5 July 2020 to 10 March 2022

Meghalaya 
 Prestone Tynsong
 First term: 6 March 2018 to 2 March 2023
 Second term: 7 March - Incumbent
 Sniawbhalang Dhar
 First term: 7 March - Incumbent

References

External links
 
Tura lok sabha  constituency election 2019 date and schedule

 
Political parties in Meghalaya
Recognised state political parties in India
Political parties established in 2013
2013 establishments in India